{{DISPLAYTITLE:C14H14}}
The molecular formula C14H14 (molar mass: 182.26 g/mol, exact mass: 182.1096 u) may refer to:

 Bibenzyl
 Cyclotetradecaheptaene, or [14]annulene

Molecular formulas